Yi Jong-geon (Hangul: 이종건, Hanja: 李鍾健 1843–1930) was a lieutenant-general of the Imperial Korean Army. He was ennobled as Baron of Japan during the Korea under Japanese rule. After March 1st Movement, Yi tried to return his title but he failed.

Life 
He was born in 1843 as the son of Yi Gue-jeong and was adopted to Yi Gue-cheol. In 1859, Yi passed the Imperial examination of military. During the Imo Incident, Yi executed some culprits related to the incident. For this merit, Yi rose his rank under the reign of Empress Myeongseong. He worked with Bak Jeongyang and Kim Hong-jip but had conflicts with them.

After Gojong returned from the Russian legation, Yi became in charge of safety and attendant: he served as the commander of police, and Mayor of Seoul. On 1 October 1897, Yi was promoted to Lieutenant general, and appointed as minister of military of Shim Soon-taek cabinet. In 1901, Yi served as the director of Military affair section of Board of Marshals, and wrote a guide about Army Ceremony. On 23 April 1902, Yi sent troops to Seongjin, where an agitation occurred. About the Korean invasion of Manchuria, Yi ordered Korean forces to cross the border of Korea and China by the request of Qing Consulate in Korea.

In 1903, Yi was appointed as special officer of Gungnaebu. He was also appointed as minister of military in 1905. On 29 July 1906, Yi was appointed as Vice Speaker of Junchuwon. Yi tried to resign from the office but, Gojong did not let him. On 31 May 1907, Yi was appointed as chief of equerry replacing Cho Tong-yun. On 13 September 1907, Yi retired from his office.

In 1910, Yi received the title of baron from the Empire of Japan. After March 1st Movement, Yi tried to return his title but he failed. He lived until 1930 and died in Korea under Japanese rule.

Because Yi tried to return his title, Yi was not considered as Chinilpa. But his son, who inherited his title was one of the Chinilpa.

Honours 

 Order of the Palgwae 3rd Class in 1901

References 

1843 births
1930 deaths
Jeonju Yi clan
Lieutenant generals of Korean Empire
Imperial Korean military personnel
Officials of the Korean Empire
19th-century Korean people
20th-century Korean people
Joseon Kazoku